Baron  was a Bakumatsu period Japanese samurai, and the 2nd Imperial Governor of former Sendai Domain in the Tōhoku region of northern Japan.

Muneatsu was the second son of Date Munenari, daimyō of Uwajima Domain, and was adopted by Date Yoshikuni in March 1868 as his heir. At that time, he was given the Court rank of Junior Fourth, Lower Grade and courtesy titles of Sakon Daiyu and Jijū.  Later that year, Sendai Domain and the Ōuetsu Reppan Dōmei were defeated in the Boshin War of the Meiji Restoration, and Yoshikuni resigned his offices and went into voluntary retirement and seclusion in Tokyo. The new Meiji government ordered that his fourth son, the two-year-old Date Munemoto  become daimyō of a much reduced Sendai Domain.

In 1869, the office of daimyō was eliminated by the new government, and Munemoto became Imperial Governor of Sendai: however, as he was still a small child, the government ordered that he be replaced by Muneatsu in 1870. Munemoto retained his position as the hereditary chieftain of the Date clan.

Following the abolition of the han system in 1871, Muneatsu was sent by the Meiji government to England for studies. He remained in England for five years, returning to Japan in February 1875. In 1884, he set up his own household separate from the main Date clan, and on May 11, 1889 was granted the title of danshaku (baron) in the new kazoku peerage system. Starting in July 1890, he served for four terms in the House of Peers in the Diet of Japan.

On June 20, 1900 he was advanced to Third Court Rank. On his death in 1911 at the age of 56, his title went to his son Date Munetsune.

References
Papinot, Edmond. (1948). Historical and Geographical Dictionary of Japan. New York: Overbeck Co.

External links
Sendai Domain on "Edo 300 HTML" (3 November 2007) 

1852 births
1911 deaths
Samurai
Kazoku
Members of the House of Peers (Japan)
People from Sendai Domain
People of Meiji-period Japan
Date clan